Fanaticism (from the Latin adverb fānāticē [fren-fānāticus; enthusiastic, ecstatic; raging, fanatical, furious]) is a belief or behavior involving uncritical zeal or an obsessive enthusiasm.

Definitions
Philosopher George Santayana defines fanaticism as "redoubling your effort when you have forgotten your aim". The fanatic displays very strict standards and little tolerance for contrary ideas or opinions. Tõnu Lehtsaar has defined the term fanaticism as the pursuit or defence of something in an extreme and passionate way that goes beyond normality. Religious fanaticism is defined by blind faith, the persecution of dissidents and the absence of reality.

Causes

Fanaticism is a result from multiple cultures interacting with one another. Fanaticism occurs most frequently when a leader makes minor variations on already existing beliefs, which then drives the followers into a frenzy. In this case, fanaticism is used as an adjective describing the nature of certain behaviors that people recognize as cult-like. Mead referred to the style of defense used when the followers are approached. The most consistent thing presented is the priming, or preexisting, conditions and mind state needed to induce fanatical behavior. Each behavior is obvious once it is pointed out; a closed mind, no interest in debating the subject of worship, and over reaction to people who do not believe.

In his book Crazy Talk, Stupid Talk, Neil Postman states that "the key to all fanatical beliefs is that they are self-confirming....(some beliefs are) fanatical not because they are 'false', but because they are expressed in such a way that they can never be shown to be false."

Similar behaviors
The behavior of a fan with overwhelming enthusiasm for a given subject is differentiated from the behavior of a fanatic by the fanatic's violation of prevailing social norms. Though the fan's behavior may be judged as odd or eccentric, it does not violate such norms. A fanatic differs from a crank, in that a crank is defined as a person who holds a position or opinion which is so far from the norm as to appear ludicrous and/or probably wrong, such as a belief in a Flat Earth. In contrast, the subject of the fanatic's obsession may be "normal", such as an interest in religion or politics, except that the scale of the person's involvement, devotion, or obsession with the activity or cause is abnormal or disproportionate to the average.

Types 

 Consumer fanaticism – the level of involvement or interest one has in the liking of a particular person, group, trend, artwork or idea
 Emotional fanaticism
 Ethnic or racial supremacist fanaticism
 Leisure fanaticism – high levels of intensity, enthusiasm, commitment and zeal shown for a particular leisure activity
 Nationalistic or patriotic fanaticism
 Political, ideological fanaticism. 
 Religious fanaticism – considered by some to be the most extreme form of religious fundamentalism. Entail promoting religious point of views
 Sports fanaticism – high levels of intensity surrounding sporting events. This is either done based on the belief that extreme fanaticism can alter games for one's favorite team (Ex: Knight Krew), or because the person uses sports activities as an ultra-masculine "proving ground" for brawls, as in the case of football hooliganism.

See also

 The Anatomy of Revolution
 Antifanaticism: A Tale of the South
 Enthusiasm
 Extremism
 Falsifiability
 Fanboy
 Fixation (psychology)
 M. Lamar Keene
 Obsession (psychology)
 The True Believer
 True-believer syndrome
 Zealotry

References

Further reading
 Haynal, A., Molnar, M. and de Puymege, G. Fanaticism. A Historical and Psychoanalytical Study. Schoken Books. New York, 1987
 Rudin, J.Fanaticism. A psychological Analysis. University of Notre Dame Press. London, 1969.
 Collins, Jack. "Real Times". University of Santa Barbara. California. 1993.

Problem behavior
Barriers to critical thinking